Nikica is a masculine given name. Nikica is a hypocoristic of the name Nikola. It may refer to:

Nikica Cukrov (born 1954), a former Croatian football player
Nikica Gabrić (born 1961), physician and politician
Nikica Jelavić (born 1985), a Herzegovinian-born Croatian footballer
Nikica Klinčarski (born 1957), a former Macedonian football player
Nikica Kolumbić (1930–2009), historian and lexicographer
Nikica Ljubek (born 1980), a Croatian sprint canoeist who competed in the early 2000s
Nikica Maglica (born 1965), a Croatian former football player
Nikica Milenković (born 1959), footballer
Nikica Valentić (born 1950), a Croatian politician

See also

Nikita (given name)

Croatian masculine given names